Qowm-e Dehqān (also Romanized as Kaumi-Dekhkan and Qawme Ḏeḩqān) is a village in Bamyan Province, Afghanistan.

See also
Bamyan Province

References

Populated places in Bamyan Province